Chatham Island (Moriori: Rēkohu,  'Misty Sun') is by far the largest island of the Chatham Islands group, in the south Pacific Ocean off the eastern coast of New Zealand's South Island.  It is said to be  "halfway between the equator and the pole, and right on the International Date Line", though the point (180°, 45°S) in fact lies ca. 173 miles WSW of the island's westernmost point. The island is called Rekohu ("misty skies") in Moriori, and Wharekauri  in Māori.

The island was named after the survey ship HMS Chatham which was the first European ship to locate the island in 1791.

Geography 

The geography of the roughly T-shaped island is dominated by three features: two bays and a lagoon. More than half of the west coast of Chatham is taken up by the deep indentation of Petre Bay. The island's main settlement of Waitangi is located in a small indentation in Petre Bay's southern coast.  Other significant settlements are Kaingaroa on the northeast promontory, and Owenga on the south side of Hanson Bay.

On the east coast is the even larger Hanson Bay, which stretches for the entire length of the island.

Much of the area between the bays is taken up by the large Te Whanga Lagoon, which drains to the sea to the east, into the southern half of Hanson Bay. The next largest lakes are Rangitahi and Huro, respectively northeast and southwest of Te Whanga. The central and north part of Chatham Island are mostly flat, with altitudes ranging from a few metres on the northeast and centre to 50 m on the northwest, but with a few scattered hillocks. The south part is higher, generally sloping down towards north and west; about half of it is over 150 m above sea level. The south coast of the island is mostly cliffs 100 m high or more. The highest point of the island (299 m) lies close to its southernmost point.

Flora and fauna 
Chatham Island hosts the only known breeding populations of the endemic and critically endangered Magenta petrel.

In popular culture
Chatham Island (or "Isle") is featured in the first and in the final chapter of Cloud Atlas, the 2004 novel by David Mitchell.  The novel was adapted for screen in 2012.

See also
 Chatham Standard Time Zone
 List of islands of New Zealand

References

 
Islands of the Chatham Islands